Josemilio González (1918–1990) was a Puerto Rican literary critic and editor.

He Went to the University of Puerto Rico, where he graduated in Liberal Arts, with specializations in Spanish, French and Philosophy. in 1940, Earned his Master's Degree in Arts at Boston University, Columbia University, Princeton University, and the Sorbonne.

He was an instructor at the University of Puerto Rico from 1946 to 1948 and 1956 to 1963.
He served in the legislature for the Puerto Rican Independence Party in 1952.

Awards
 1990 American Book Award, for Vivir a Hostos

Works
"Otoño", taino world
 Hostos as a philosopher, Boston University, 1941
 Hostos Como Filósofo (1941) – (Hostos as Philosopher)
 Oda al mar de Guajataca (1954) – (Ode to the Sea from Guajataca)
 Profecía de Puerto Rico (1954) – (Prophecy of Puerto Rico)
 Cántico Mortal a Julia de Burgos (1956) – (Mortal Song of Julia de Burgos)
 Los Poetas Puertorriqueños de la Década del 30 (1960) Instituto de Cultura Puertorriqueña, – (The Puerto Rican Poets of the 30s)
 Parábola del Canto (1960) – (Parable of Song)
 Soledad Absoluta: Diario Poético (1971) – (Absolute Solitude: Official Poetic)
 Antología Poética de Francisco Matos Paoli Universidad de Puerto Rico, (1972) – (Francisco Matos Paoli Poetry Anthology)
 La Poesía Contemporánea de Puerto Rico, 1930–1960 (1972) Instituto de Cultura Puertorriquña – (Contemporary Poetry of Puerto Rico, 1930–1960)
 La Poesía en Puerto Rico (1976) – (Poetry in Puerto Rico)
 Poesía y Lengua en la Obra de Francisco Manrique Cabrera (1976) – (Poetry and Language in the Work of Francisco Manrique Cabrera)
 Vivir a Hostos: ensayos'', San Juan, P.R.: Comité Pro Celebración Sesquicentenario del Natalicio de Eugenio María de Hostos, 1989.

References

External links

"González, Josemilo", Worldcat
"González, Jose emilio.", Worldcat

1918 births
1990 deaths
People from Gurabo, Puerto Rico
Puerto Rican academics
Puerto Rico Independence Party politicians
Columbia University alumni
Princeton University alumni
University of Puerto Rico alumni
University of Puerto Rico faculty
Boston University alumni
University of Paris alumni
Puerto Rican independence activists
American Book Award winners
American expatriates in France